Jan Helstrup Budtz (born 20 April 1979) is a Danish footballer who plays as a goalkeeper. He works as the head of operations for League One side Doncaster Rovers, as well as playing semi-professionally for Rossington Main.

He has previously played for B 1909 and FC Nordsjælland before moving to England with Doncaster Rovers. He also played in the Football League with Wolverhampton Wanderers, Hartlepool United and Oldham Athletic, before moving into Non-league football with Eastwood Town, Stalybridge Celtic, Worksop Town, Gainsborough Trinity, Buxton, and Grantham Town.

Playing career
Born in Hillerød, Budtz became an instant hero in his first game for Doncaster Rovers when he replaced the injured Andy Warrington during a League Cup tie against Manchester City in September 2005. He saved two of the three penalties taken by the Premier League side during the shootout to send Doncaster into the next round (the first penalty, by Darius Vassell, hit the crossbar). His name was subsequently plastered all over local and national newspapers the following day and he also made several appearances on local TV news channels.

Following his initial day of glory, he largely failed to progress though. Although he enjoyed a good run in the first team in the 2005–06 season, he was increasingly sidelined in Spring 2006. Budtz fractured a bone in his hand in January 2006, and Doncaster Rovers quickly signed replacement Alan Blayney.

By the beginning of the 2006–07 season, he was relegated to third choice behind Benjamin Smith and Blayney. Budtz signed an emergency loan deal with Wolverhampton Wanderers of the Championship. He eventually signed a six-week extension with Wolves, and made his debut on 17 March as a half-time substitute in a 2–2 draw at Sheffield Wednesday. 
He was eventually recalled by his parent club on 24 April, following their own on-loan goalkeeper, Neil Sullivan, returning to Leeds United.

Budtz was signed by fellow League One side Hartlepool United on 29 June 2007.
He was their first-choice goalkeeper throughout the first half of the season, but lost his place for the final months after some poor performances.

On 14 February 2009, he was loaned out to Oldham Athletic on a month's loan, making his debut on the same day in a 2–1 victory over Northampton Town. He returned to Hartlepool but was released from his contract on 6 May after being deemed surplus to requirements.

He signed for Conference North side Eastwood Town on 16 September 2010, but left with mutual consent in March 2010 after a 'financial disagreement.'

In summer 2010 he signed for Conference North side Stalybridge Celtic.

In the summer of 2012, Budtz signed a contract with Northern Premier League side Buxton, however he joined Conference North side Gainsborough Trinity on 26 July 2012. After one season with Trinity, which included reaching the semi-finals of the FA Trophy, Budtz was released by the club on 24 May 2013 and joined Northern Premier League side Worksop Town, however, in June 2014, Budtz returned to Gainsborough. After 2 years with Gainsborough, Budtz rejoined Buxton on 27 May 2016.

Budtz had a spell with Rossington Main and later joined Grantham Town at the end of June 2020.

On 25 August 2021, Budtz returned to Worksop Town having been released by Grantham, but ON 28 September 2021 he made his second debut back with Rossington Main.

Coaching career
On 16 January 2013, as well as playing for Gainsborough, Budtz re-joined former club Doncaster Rovers media team.

He is now the head of operations at Doncaster's training centre.

Personal life
He is the twin brother of fellow footballer Ole Budtz. He also has three sons, 21, 14 and 1 as of 2021.

References

External links
 In The Mad Crowd
 
 

1979 births
Living people
People from Hillerød Municipality
Association football goalkeepers
Danish men's footballers
Danish expatriate men's footballers
Danish expatriate sportspeople in England
Expatriate footballers in England
FC Nordsjælland players
Doncaster Rovers F.C. players
Wolverhampton Wanderers F.C. players
Hartlepool United F.C. players
Oldham Athletic A.F.C. players
Eastwood Town F.C. players
Stalybridge Celtic F.C. players
Buxton F.C. players
Gainsborough Trinity F.C. players
Worksop Town F.C. players
Rossington Main F.C. players
Grantham Town F.C. players
English Football League players
Danish twins
Twin sportspeople
Doncaster Rovers F.C. non-playing staff
Sportspeople from the Capital Region of Denmark